Fourth Drawer Down is a compilation album by Scottish post-punk and new wave band the Associates, released in October 1981 by independent record label Situation Two. It compiles the A- and B-sides from the six singles the band released that year on the label. The album was re-issued in 2000 by V2 Records, containing five bonus tracks.

Recording
In July 1981 the Associates appeared in Smash Hits magazine with lead vocalist Billy Mackenzie announcing his plan to release ten singles over the remainder of the year. His ambition was founded on a plan to use competing label money to record new material then release previously recorded material. Many of the songs that appeared on Fourth Drawer Down had a notably darker and more experimental edge than their debut studio album The Affectionate Punch (1980), although Mackenzie's lyrics often defied literal interpretation. An early single "Tell Me Easter's on Sunday" is propelled by a somber pulsing beat with a cycling mournful guitar line. The song "Q Quarters" — called "desolately beautiful" by Smash Hits — ends with the striking lines: "Washing down bodies / Seems to me a dead-end chore / Floors me completely / Beauty drips from every pore". Washing down bodies was a job that Billy Mackenzie said his grandmother did during World War II. The song "Kitchen Person" features a rhythm taken from an electric typewriter and Mackenzie singing down the tube of a vacuum cleaner (an effort that earned them Single of the Week in Melody Maker).

The album title had a literal origin: the fourth drawer down in a chest in the band's flat at the time contained their supply of "over the counter herbal relaxant tablets that when taken by the handful... would acts as a sleeping aid as well as producing a pleasant bedtime buzz." The cover photograph was taken in the swimming pool of the recording studio they used in Oxfordshire.

Critical reception

Fourth Drawer Down has been well received by music critics, with reviewers commenting on the band's increased experimentalism. NME journalist Richard Cook wrote that the Associates "brutalise form with a purpose," continuing: "In trying to dismantle the accepted notions of organised playing and reconstructing with uncaring regard for accessibility – all these tracks are cluttered, confused and strewn with near-random noise – The Associates reassert their humanity in electric music."

In a 2016 review, Alastair McKay of Uncut called Fourth Drawer Down "an extraordinary document on which the sense of mystery deepens, and the commitment to sonic experiment becomes more pronounced." Trouser Press noted an overall sense of "determined experimentation" on the album, despite finding it "lessened by the exclusion of certain B-sides in favor of later tracks which reveal Mackenzie's growing preference for pose over accomplishment."

Track listing

Personnel
Credits are adapted from the Fourth Drawer Down liner notes.

The Associates
 Billy Mackenzie – vocals, one-string guitar
 Alan Rankine – guitars; keyboards; other instruments
 Michael Dempsey – bass guitar, keyboards
 John Murphy – drums, marimba

Production and artwork
 Mike Hedges – production; engineering
 Flood – production
 Antoine Giacomoni – sleeve photography

References

External links
 

The Associates (band) albums
Albums produced by Mike Hedges
Albums produced by Flood (producer)
1981 compilation albums
Beggars Banquet Records compilation albums
Situation Two compilation albums
V2 Records compilation albums